The snowy-crowned robin-chat (Cossypha niveicapilla) is a species of bird in the family Muscicapidae. It is also known as the snowy-headed robin-chat. 
It is found in Angola, Benin, Burkina Faso, Burundi, Cameroon, Central African Republic, Chad, Republic of the Congo, Democratic Republic of the Congo, Ivory Coast, Ethiopia, Gabon, Gambia, Ghana, Guinea, Guinea-Bissau, Kenya, Liberia, Mali, Mauritania, Niger, Nigeria, Rwanda, Senegal, Sierra Leone, Sudan, Tanzania, Togo, and Uganda.
Its natural habitats are subtropical or tropical dry forest, subtropical or tropical moist lowland forest, and moist savanna.

References

snowy-crowned robin-chat
Birds of Sub-Saharan Africa
snowy-crowned robin-chat
Taxonomy articles created by Polbot